Diaphania hyalinata, the melonworm moth,  is a moth of the family Crambidae. It is found in eastern North America, south to Central and South America, including Suriname and the Caribbean.

The wingspan is 27–30 mm. The wings are pearly white centrally, and slightly iridescent, but are edged with a broad band of dark brown. Adults are on wing from October to November in the northern part of the range and all year round in multiple generations in Florida and further south.

The larvae feed on various plants in the cucumber family, including cucumber, melon, pumpkin, and squash. They construct a loose silken structure under the leaves of their host plant.

References

Moths described in 1767
Diaphania
Taxa named by Carl Linnaeus
Moths of North America
Moths of South America